The 1977 Champion Spark Plug 400 was a NASCAR Winston Cup Series racing event that took place on August 22, 1977, at Michigan International Speedway in Brooklyn, Michigan.

Background
Opened in 1968, the track's turns are banked at eighteen degrees, while the 3,600-foot-long front stretch, the location of the finish line, is banked at twelve degrees. The back stretch, has a five degree banking and is 2,242 feet long.

Race report
There were 36 drivers on the racing grid; all of them were born in the United States. While Cale Yarborough and Darrell Waltrip would duel for the lead during the opening laps of this racing event, Waltrip would battle against Benny Parsons for supremacy during the closing laps. Waltrip defeated David Pearson by two car lengths in front of an audience of 35,000. Waltrip's crew chief for this race was Buddy Parrott.

Janet Guthrie was the only female in this race; scoring the first of 5 career top-10 finishes and proving that women could perform well in races instead of just being the wife of a race car driver. Earle Canavan would finish last due to an engine issue on the first lap. Most of the DNFs in this race would be due to engine issues. The lowest finishing driver running at the end was Dave Marcis. Only six drivers would end the race on the lead lap; with Yarborough being the lowest driver on the lead lap. After this race, Cale Yarborough and Richard Petty would be within 50 points of each other; both gunning for a championship.

Sam Sommers was in the running for Rookie of the Year in 1977. He actually got a pole that year and some decent finishes. For reasons unknown after 1977, he only made two more starts in NASCAR in 1978, and completely disappeared.

The purse for this race was $108,825 ($ when adjusted for inflation); Waltrip brought home $16,820 ($ when adjusted for inflation) while Canavan earned $600 ($ when adjusted for inflation). Terry Ryan would retire from NASCAR Cup Series racing after this event, finishing in 9th place.

Qualifying

Finishing order

Timeline
Section reference:
 Lap 1: Cale Yarborough was officially leading the race as the green flag was waved.
 Lap 5: Baxter Price fell out with engine failure.
 Lap 41: Richard Childress fell out with engine failure.
 Lap 61: Ed Negre fell out with engine failure.
 Lap 68: Buddy Baker fell out with engine failure.
 Lap 76: Bill Elliott fell out with engine failure.
 Lap 85: Harold Miller's vehicle suffered from a problematic driveshaft.
 Lap 114: Jocko Maggiacomo fell out with engine failure.
 Lap 117: Bobby Allison fell out with engine failure.
 Lap 125: Butch Hartman fell out with engine failure.
 Lap 134: Joey Mihalic's wheel started acting funny.
 Lap 141: Frank Warren fell out with engine failure.
 Finish: Darrell Waltrip was officially declared the winner of the race.

Standings after the race

References

Champion Spark Plug 400
Champion Spark Plug 400
NASCAR races at Michigan International Speedway